Kingone Wang (born 5 May 1980) is a Taiwanese actor, singer and host. He was part of the boy band Comic Boyz and winner of Taiwanese Golden Bell Awards for Best Supporting Actor. He is the alumni of both National Chiao Tung University and Chinese Culture University.

Early life
On 5 May 1980, Wang was born in Taipei. He is the only child in his family. His given name "" means "the one to inherit".

His father is a senior doctor in dermatological department. His mother died of cancer when he was only 17.

During his years at the Affiliated Senior High School of National Taiwan Normal University, Wang frequently topped the class; the school subsequently recommended him for admission to National Chiao Tung University.

Career
Wang began his media career in modeling and attracted public attention with his figure and looks. Many feel that Wang's attractive figure is a combination of the Hong Kong popstar Andy Lau and Taiwanese popstar Jay Chou. in 2002, Wang was signed by Sony Music (Taiwan) to form a 6-man boy band Comic Boyz (可米小子) where he was the leader of the group. They acted in several Taiwanese dramas and released 3 albums: Hey Hah! (可米小子), 2002; 青春紀念冊 2003; Goodbye 可米小子新歌+精選, 2005 before disbanding in 2005.

After Comic Boyz disbanded, Wang continued to pursue his career in the Taiwanese entertainment industry, hosting TV shows and playing supporting roles in TV dramas. In 2005, Wang played a supporting role in the drama Evil Scorpion (魔蠍) for which he won the 2005 Best Supporting Actor at the 40th Golden Bell Awards, Taiwan. He also starred alongside Rainie Yang and Mike He in Devil Beside You (惡魔在身邊) in 2005 and Why Why Love (換換愛) in 2007, where he played a sensitive university basketball team captain and a large shopping centre's CEO, respectively. Wang is currently signed by Ocean Butterflies Music Co Ltd, and released his first EP Love, KingOne (換換愛) on 14 August 2007.

In 2009, Kingone was nominated for the second time for Best Supporting Actor at the 44th Golden Bell Awards, Taiwan for his role as Gao Yi in Black & White.

Personal life
Wang married Lin Hsiao-wei in November 2017 after two years of relationship. Together they have a daughter who was born in 2018.

Wang is able to speak English, Mandarin and Taiwanese Hokkien. He is currently completing Graduate degrees in both Civil Engineering at National Chiao Tung University and Philosophy at Chinese Culture University.

In his spare time, Wang likes music and sport, especially golf and darts.

Filmography

Film

Television series
{| class="wikitable sortable"
|-
! Year !!English title !! Original title !! Role  !! class="unsortable" | Notes
|-
| || || 好美麗診所嘿哈 || 池珍東 || 
|-
| 2002 || Meteor Garden II || 流星花園2 || Secretary || Cameo
|-
| || || 偷偷愛上你 ||  || Cameo
|-
| 2003 || Love Storm || 狂愛龍卷風 || || Cameo
|-
| 2003 || Spicy Hot Student || 麻辣高校生 || Comic Boyz member ||
|-
| 2003 || Godfather in Pink || 粉紅教父小甜甜 || Idol group member || 
|-
| 2004 || Mars || 戰神MARS || Ling & Sheng's biological father || Cameo
|-
| 2005 || Evil Scorpion || 魔蠍 || Zhang Shu-wei||
|-
| 2005 || Starry Night || 愛在星光燦爛時 || Chuan-yi || 
|-
| 2005 || Devil Beside You || 惡魔在身邊 || Shang Yuan-yi || 
|-
| 2005 || Wind Chasers || 追風少年 || He Fei-li || 
|-
| 2006 || Goku Dou High School''' || 極道學園 || Chou Shao-qi || 
|-
| 2006 || Silence || 深情密碼 || Huang Zhi-ye || 
|-
| 2006 || My Son Is A Mob Boss || 我的兒子是老大 || Frank || 
|-
| 2007 || Why Why Love || 換換愛 || Huo Yan  || 
|-
| 2007 || The Legend of Chu Liuxiang || 楚留香傳奇 || Zhongyuan Yidianhong || CCTV-8
|-
| 2008 || Wish to See You Again || 這裡發現愛 || Ma Yong-rui || 
|-
| 2009 || Black & White || 痞子英雄 || Gao Yi || 
|-
| 2010 || Scent of Love || 就是要香戀 || Xiang Zhi-yuan|| 
|-
| 2011 || Love You || 醉後決定愛上你|| Ren Yi-xiang || 
|-
| 2011 || Next Heroes || 真的漢子 || Jingcai Ge || Next TV
|-
| 2012
| Yours Fatefully|| 孤男寡女 || Soo Xiao-yi  || 
|-
| 2012 || Fondant Garden || 翻糖花園 || Yan Han-xiang  ||
|-
| 2013 || Happy 300 Days || 遇見幸福300天 || Qi Tian  || 
|-
| 2014 || Tie the Knot || 妈咪的男朋友 || Liu Zi-jun || 
|-
| 2015 || Someone like you|| 聽見幸福 || Fang Zhan-cheng  || 
|-
|2015
|The Day I Lost You|失去你的那一天
|Meng Zeming 
|
|-
| rowspan="2" | 2018 || Till We Meet Again || 千年来说对不起 || Zhao Yaojin  || Wawa Pictures production
|-
| Till We Meet Again – Prequel || 千年来说对不起-前传 || Sun Wukong  || Toggle original series
|-
|2019
|Goodbye My Princess|  东宫
|Li Chengye
|Youku
|-
|2019 || Brave to Love|| 愛情白皮書 ||Qiu Ting || Special appearance
|-
|2019 || Sweet Family|| 美味滿閣||Wang Zi-yao || 
|-
|2020|| The Devil Punisher|| 天巡者||Siming Xingjun || Cameo 
|-
|2021|| Piggy's Counterattack|| 三隻小豬的逆襲||Lu Jin-zhou || 
|-
|2021|| The Memory Garden|| 如果花知道||Huang Jian-xiong || Cameo
|-
|2022|| We Are Young, We Are Fighting|| 戰時我們正年少||Feng Mang || 
|-
|TBA || The Attorney From Bachimen|| 八尺門的辯護人 || || 
|-
|TBA || Love in a Fallen City|| 一身孤注掷温柔 || || 
|-
|}

Hosting
 Azio TV Asia Entertainment Centre (weekend host)
 Azio TV Azio Music Expert (東風音樂通)
 Comic Boyz Adventure (惡童探險記)
 Eastern U-STAR Asia Popular New Artiste co-host (東風U-STAR亞洲新紅人選主持人之一)
 Magic Love Horoscope (星座愛情魔法)
 2005 Golden Bell Awards, red carpet co-host

Discography

Solo EP

Soundtrack contributions

Comic Boyz albums

BookMen's Talk'' (型男Talk): A book co-written by Wang and Matt Wu, men's talk around their lives, the world and philosophy. . Release date: 20 December 2006)

References

External links

Kingone Wang at chinesemov.com
  Wang Kingone@Ocean Butterflies Music
  Kingone's blog

1980 births
Living people
Taiwanese male television actors
Taiwanese Mandopop singers
National Chiao Tung University alumni
Chinese Culture University alumni
Affiliated Senior High School of National Taiwan Normal University alumni
Male actors from Taipei
Musicians from Taipei
21st-century Taiwanese singers